Ylinen Kassa is a village in the county of Norrbotten in Sweden.

Populated places in Norrbotten County
Villages in Sweden